Mythimna obscura is a moth of the family Noctuidae first described by Frederic Moore in 1882. It is found in Sri Lanka and India.

References

External links
Molecular Phylogeny of Indonesian Armyworm Mythimna Guenée (Lepidoptera: Noctuidae: Hadeninae) Based on CO I Gene Sequences

Moths of Asia
Moths described in 1882
Hadeninae

Mythimnini